"If Ya Gettin' Down" is a single by English boy band Five. It was released on 19 July 1999 as the lead single from their second studio album, Invincible (1999). It was co-written by Richard Stannard, Julian Gallagher, and band members J Brown, Sean Conlon and Abs Breen, while Stannard and Gallagher produced it. Michael Cleveland is also credited as a writer since the song samples Indeep's 1982 song "Last Night a D.J. Saved My Life".

The song was certified gold in the United Kingdom for sales and streams of over 400,000 units. The song charted at number two in the UK and Australia and reached number one in New Zealand and Scotland.

Chart performance
The song reached number two in the United Kingdom, where it was certified gold for sales and streams of over 400,000 units. It was also certified platinum in Australia, where it reached number two. The song topped the charts in New Zealand and Scotland; it was their second number-one single in the former country.

Track listings
UK, Irish and Australian CD1
 "If Ya Gettin' Down"
 "When I Remember When"
 Enhanced CD

UK, Irish and Australian CD2
 "If Ya Gettin' Down"
 "Everyday"
 Five fans' interview request line

UK cassette single and European CD single
 "If Ya Gettin' Down" – 2:59
 "When I Remember When" – 3:58

Credits and personnel
Credits are lifted from the UK CD1 liner notes and the Invincible album booklet.

Studio
 Recorded at Windmill Lane Studios (Dublin, Ireland)

Personnel

 Richard Stannard – writing, production
 Julian Gallagher – writing, production
 Jason "J" Brown – writing
 Sean Conlon – writing
 Richard Breen – writing
 Michael Cleveland – writing ("Last Night a D.J. Saved My Life")
 Filo – backing vocals
 Mista Dexter – turntables
 Adrian Bushby – recording, mixing, engineering
 Conal Markey – recording assistant
 Pat McGovern – recording assistant

Charts

Weekly charts

Year-end charts

Certifications and sales

Release history

References

1998 songs
1999 singles
Bertelsmann Music Group singles
Five (band) songs
Number-one singles in New Zealand
Number-one singles in Scotland
RCA Records singles
Song recordings produced by Richard Stannard (songwriter)
Songs written by Abz Love
Songs written by Jason "J" Brown
Songs written by Julian Gallagher
Songs written by Richard Stannard (songwriter)
Songs written by Sean Conlon